Progër is a village and a former municipality in the Korçë County, southeastern Albania. At the 2015 local government reform it became a subdivision of the municipality Devoll. The population at the 2011 census was 3,988. The municipal unit consists of the villages Progër, Mançurisht, Cangonj, Pilur, Vranisht, Bickë, Rakickë and Shyec.

Demographics 
In 1900, the village of Rakickë was a mixed village whose population consisted of 360 Albanians and 300 Orthodox Macedonians, though by the 1970s had become a wholly Albanian inhabited village.

During the late 2000s linguists Klaus Steinke and Xhelal Ylli seeking to corroborate villages cited in past literature as being Slavic speaking carried out fieldwork in some villages of the area. Rakickë and Shyec was noted as not having a Slavic speaking population with villagers speaking Albanian and older generations stating have used only that language. Villagers from nearby Pustec municipality that speak south Slavic languages being well informed about the situation of their minority and neighbouring villages stated that they were not aware of anyone having spoken their language in Rakickë and Shyec.

Notable people
Ali Progri

References

Former municipalities in Korçë County
Administrative units of Devoll (municipality)
Villages in Korçë County